Jogu Ramanna (born 4 July 1963) is an Indian politician who was the Minister of Forest and Environment & Backward Classes Welfare of Telangana from 2 June 2014 to 6 September 2018. He is a Member of the Telangana Legislative Assembly from Adilabad constituency since 2 June 2014. He was earlier a member of Telugu Desam Party. He is an M.L.A. from Adilabad assembly constituency from past four times 2018, 2014, 2012 by elections and 2009 also.

Early life
Ramanna was born in Deepaiguda village of Adilabad district.

Career
Ramanna started his political career as Sarpanch for Deepaiguda village. He served as MPTC for Jainath and ZPTC. He is a two-time M.L.A. from Adilabad assembly constituency. He raised a banner of revolt on Telangana statehood against party president Chandrababu Naidu by aligning himself with Nagam Janardhan Reddy.

He joined Telangana Rashtra Samithi on 10 October 2011 and in 2014 Telangana Assembly Election he was re-elected from Adilabad Assembly constituency. He was inducted into Cabinet on June 2, 2014, and became Forest Environment & BC Welfare Minister of Telangana.

Personal life
He was married to Rama and blessed with 2 sons.

References

Living people
Telugu Desam Party politicians
Telangana Rashtra Samithi politicians
Andhra Pradesh MLAs 2009–2014
Telangana MLAs 2014–2018
1963 births
Telangana MLAs 2018–2023